The London Bo Diddley Sessions is the 17th studio album by musician Bo Diddley recorded in 1973 and released on the Chess label.

Reception

Allmusic awarded the album 2½ stars with reviewer Bruce Eder stating "Bo's presence was somewhat overwhelmed by the massive number of session musicians involved (well-meaning though they may have been) and more so, because Bo was still looking for a new sound, ... The songs are pretty fair -- a mix of soul and funk -- with elements of his old sound, and this is probably the best compromise he achieved during this phase of his career, between the old and the new".

Track listing 
All tracks by Ellas McDaniel except where noted
 "Don't Want No Lyin' Woman" – 3:58
 "Bo Diddley" – 2:54
 "Going Down" (Allen Toussaint) – 2:54
 "Make a Hit Record" – 4:59
 "Bo-Jam" – 3:31
 "Husband-In-Law" (Sam Dees, Jimmy Lewis, Frederick Knight) – 3:32
 "Do the Robot" – 5:40
 "Sneakers on a Rooster" (Dees, Dee Camon) – 2:41
 "Get Out of My Life" – 5:09
Recorded at Ter-Mar Studio, Chicago, IL (tracks 3, 6 & 8) and London, England (tracks 1, 2, 4, 5, 7 & 9)

Personnel 
Bo Diddley – vocals, guitar
Arthur Hoyle, Frank Gordon, Murray Watson – trumpet (tracks 3, 6 & 8)
Steve Galloway – trombone (tracks 3, 6 & 8)
Clifford Davis – tenor saxophone, baritone saxophone (tracks 3, 6 & 8) 
Gene Barge – tenor saxophone (tracks 3, 6 & 8) 
Willie Henderson – baritone saxophone (tracks 3, 6 & 8) 
Tennyson Stephens – piano (tracks 3, 6 & 8)
Eddie Hardin – organ (tracks 1, 2, 4, 5, 7 & 9)
Ray Fenwick (tracks 1, 2, 4, 5, 7 & 9), Gerald Sims (tracks 3, 6 & 8), Phil Upchurch (tracks 3, 6 & 8) – guitar
Richard Evans (tracks 3, 6 & 8), Roy Wood (tracks 1, 2, 4, 5, 7 & 9) – bass
Keith Smart – drums (tracks 1, 2, 4, 5, 7 & 9)
Robert Crowder, Brian Grice – drums, percussion (tracks 3, 6 & 8)
Nigel Grainge – percussion (tracks 1, 2, 4, 5, 7 & 9)
Charles Grimar (tracks 1, 2, 4, 5, 7 & 9), Derf Reklan Raheem (tracks 3, 6 & 8) – congas
Cookie Vee – tambourine, vocals
Richard Evans - arranger

References 

1973 albums
Chess Records albums
Bo Diddley albums
Albums produced by Esmond Edwards